The Churruca class was a series of five Spanish Navy ships which originated from the US Navy s. They were all acquired in the 1970s in FRAM I configuration.

Development 
These were ships built during the Second World War and modernized from 1959 within the FRAM I program, which were in service with the United States Navy until their delivery to Spain. Ships similar to these were delivered by the United States Navy to most of its allies during the same time, and some of them were in service until the early 21st century. Although they were old ships, the fact is that they were mounted with quite modern sensors (seen from the point of view of the 60s), but they became obsolete throughout the 1970s and, especially, the 1980s. These ships were similar in their equipment to the modernized , were an important reinforcement for the Spanish Navy in the 1970s, actively participating in national and international maneuvers. In the Spanish Armada they came to be known jokingly as "the blind men of the eleven", in reference to the lack of acuity of their sensors at the end of their useful life and to their belonging to the 11th Escort Squadron (in Spain, the acronym ONCE correspond to the National Organization of the Spanish Blind). 

The vessel also participated in the Spanish evacuation of the Spanish Sahara in 1975, after the green march during the Western Sahara War. Blas de Lezo was part of the fleet in control of the strait during the Desert Storm operation in 1991, at which time, due to the shortage of escorts in the Navy, some of these ships operated alongside the Alpha Group, carrying out maritime control tasks in the Eastern Mediterranean.

Entering the 1990s, the Oquendo-class destroyers were progressively decommissioned, until the disappearance of the 11th Escort Squadron in which was dissolved on 2 September 1991. With the disappearance of these ships, the history of destroyers in the Spanish Navy was closed, at least for the moment, being the country that began to use them, although it is true that the dividing line between frigates and destroyers, today were faint.

Ships in class

Gallery

See also 
  - another class of destroyers transferred from the US Navy to Armada Española

References

 
Destroyers of the Spanish Navy
Destroyer classes